Charles Cochrane (1807-1855) was a Scottish author, campaigner for the poor in London in the 'hungry 40s' and, in the last years of his life, campaigner against Sunday trading. Cochrane was born in Madras, the son of Basil Cochrane who himself was the sixth son of Scottish nobleman and politician Thomas Cochrane, 8th Earl of Dundonald.

1830 saw the publication of Cochranes' The Journal of a Tour Made by Senor Juan De Vega, the Spanish Minstrel of 1828-29 which recounted Cochrane's tour of Britain and Ireland disguised as a Spanish minstrel, 'exploiting somewhat belatedly the sympathy felt for Spanish refugees after the French invasion of 1823'.  Cochrane's Spanish Minstrel was satirised by Henry Mayhew in his one act play The Wandering Minstrel.

After the introduction of the harsh poor laws of the 1830s Cochrane became increasingly concerned with responding in a practical way to poverty, deprivation and hunger in London. In 1842 he founded and became President of the National Philanthropic Association and in 1846 he founded the Poor Man's Guardian Society, 'instituted for the purpose of aiding the destitute in their approach for parochial relief, and for securing them the legal and humane dispensation of the Poor-law.' The society attempted to get the support of Charles Dickens who was cautious in his response but did pay them a subscription of five guineas.  The organisation described Charles Dickens as a vice-president. Cochrane became an increasingly prominent figure in London circles with his campaigns for the poor, advocating radical improvements in sanitation and public health.

By 1848 the NPA had introduced a system of paid street cleaners to West Central London

References 

1807 births
1855 deaths
Scottish humanitarians
Scottish reformers
British social reformers
19th-century Scottish writers